Home Laundry Company is a historic laundry building located at Bloomington, Monroe County, Indiana.  The original section was built in 1922, and is a two-story, roughly square, red brick building.  A one-story Moderne style wraparound addition was built in 1947–1948.  It continued to house a laundry when listed in 2000 and currently houses a Chinese restaurant..

It was listed on the National Register of Historic Places in 2000.

References

Former laundry buildings
Industrial buildings and structures on the National Register of Historic Places in Indiana
Industrial buildings completed in 1922
Streamline Moderne architecture in Indiana
Buildings and structures in Bloomington, Indiana
National Register of Historic Places in Monroe County, Indiana